Monterrey is a district of the Aserrí canton, in the San José province of Costa Rica.

History 
Monterrey was created on 5 April 1966 by Decreto 15. Segregated from Legua.

Geography 
Monterrey has an area of  km2 and an elevation of  metres.

Demographics 

For the 2011 census, Monterrey had a population of  inhabitants.

Transportation

Road transportation 
The district is covered by the following road routes:
 National Route 313
 National Route 336

References 

Districts of San José Province
Populated places in San José Province